Rima Rima (Quechua rima speaking, rima rima a flower (Ranunculus weberbaueri syn. Krapfia weberbaueri)), is a  mountain in the Cordillera Blanca in the Andes of Peru. It is situated in the Ancash Region, Huaraz Province, Independencia District, northeast of Huaraz (Waras). Rima Rima lies southeast of Wallunarahu, on the ridge southwest of Ranrapallqa.

See also 
 Churup
 Wamashrahu

References

Mountains of Peru
Mountains of Ancash Region